Das Kartoffelmuseum (The Potato Museum) in Munich is one of three potato museums in Germany and is concentrated on the art historical aspects of the potato. It was opened in 1996 by the Otto Eckart Foundation. Otto Eckart was owner of the Pfanni food manufacturer until its sale to Unilever and is the son of the company founder Werner Eckart. In addition to his work as a member of the board of trustees, he served as the Honorary Consul of the Republic of Guatemala.

The museum is based on a comprehensive collection of paintings (oil paintings, watercolors, engravings, drawings, lithographs, prints, naive glass paintings, modern graphics). In addition to the exhibition, the museum also includes a specialist library for scientific research.

Until March 2016, the museum was located in the so-called "Eckhaus" on the former premises of Pfanni factory on Grafinger Strasse, where the company produced potato products. The museum began to prepare for its move that month.  As of November 2018, the museum website states is it temporarily closed and gives no information regarding reopening.

The museum was divided into eight exhibition rooms before the provisional closure:
 History: From Inca gold to folk food
 Flowers, plants, tubers
 Cultivation and harvesting
 Market scenes
 Multi-talent potato
 Rare collection
 Fattening food and poor people eating
 Gallery of Modern Art

In 2006, the potato museum expanded with a new department, the Pfanni Museum, which depicts the history of the Pfanni trademark from 1949 to 1999.

References

External links 
 Official website

Rural history museums in Germany
Potato museums
Museums in Munich
1996 establishments in Germany
Food museums in Germany